Newsagent's shop, or Newsstand, is a business that sells newspapers, magazines, cigarettes, snacks and often items of local interest.

Newsstand may also refer to:
CNN NewsStand, a project to create CNN programming associated with publications owned by Time Warne
Newsstand (software), an iOS app which can download and display newspapers and magazines